John William Ward may refer to:

John Ward, 1st Earl of Dudley (1781–1833), British statesman
John William Ward (manager) (born 1942), British trade unionist and opera administrator
John William Ward (professor) (1922–1985), professor of English and history, and President of Amherst College